Pohocco Township is one of twenty-four townships in Saunders County, Nebraska, United States. The population was 1,207 at the 2020 census. A 2021 estimate placed the township's population at 1,238.

The township was named after Pahuk, a high bluff on the south bank of the Platte River.  The bluff does not actually lie within the township.

See also
County government in Nebraska

References

External links
City-Data.com

Townships in Saunders County, Nebraska
Townships in Nebraska